The following articles contain lists of listed buildings in the borough of Halton in Cheshire, England:

Listed buildings in Hale, Halton
Listed buildings in Runcorn (rural area)
Listed buildings in Runcorn (urban area)
Listed buildings in Widnes

Halton, Cheshire